The Meyer Hills are a small group of hills which includes Beaudoin Peak, located between the Enterprise Hills and the head of Constellation Inlet, in the Heritage Range, Ellsworth Mountains, Antarctica. They were named by the University of Minnesota Ellsworth Mountains Party of 1962–63 for Harvey J. Meyer, a geologist with that party.

Features
Geographical features include:

 Beaudoin Peak
 Holt Peak
 Seaquist Peak
 Skytrain Ice Rise

References

Hills of Ellsworth Land